Adoration of the Shepherds may refer to several works by the Dutch artist Matthias Stom:
Adoration of the Shepherds, c.1640-1645, Museo di Capodimonte, Naples
Adoration of the Shepherds, now in the Palazzo Madama, Turin
Adoration of the Shepherds, now in the North Carolina Museum of Art, Raleigh, North Carolina, United States
Adoration of the Shepherds, now in the Musée d'Arts de Nantes, France

References

Paintings by Matthias Stom
Stom
Paintings in the collection of the Museo Civico d'Arte Antica
Paintings in the collection of the North Carolina Museum of Art
Paintings in the collection of the Musée d'Arts de Nantes
Paintings in the collection of the Museo di Capodimonte